The  was a food supply ship (reefer ship) of the Imperial Japanese Navy (IJN) serving during World War II, the only ship of her class.

Background
In 1939, the IJN planned two food supply ships for China Area Fleet under the Maru 4 Programme. One was the 1000 ton Kinesaki (initial named Support ship No.4006), the other the 600 ton Nosaki (initial named Support ship No.4007). Their duty was to deliver fresh fish to the fleet. Therefore, they installed a large freezer in the hull of each ship, and in appearance they looked like fishing trawlers. The IJN compared Kinesaki with Nosaki, and they decided to mass-produce Kinesaki.

Career
22 July 1940: Launched.
25 October 1940: Renamed .
18 March 1941: Completed and assigned to the Sasebo Naval District.
1 April 1942; Renamed Nosaki, classified miscellaneous service ship to special service ship (food supply ship), and assigned to the Kainan Guard District.
(later): She engaged in food transportation along the coast of China, Taiwan, and French Indochina.
28 December 1944: Sunk by USS Dace off Cape Varella.
10 March 1945: Removed from the naval ship list.

Bibliography
 Ships of the World special issue Vol.47 Auxiliary Vessels of the Imperial Japanese Navy, Kaijinsha, (Japan), March 1997
 The Maru Special, Japanese Naval Vessels No.34, Japanese auxiliary vessels, Ushio Shobō (Japan), December 1979
 Senshi Sōsho Vol.31, Naval armaments and war preparation (1), "Until November 1941", Asagumo Simbun (Japan), November 1969

World War II naval ships of Japan
1940 ships
Maritime incidents in December 1944
Ships built by Mitsubishi Heavy Industries